Radical 54 or radical long stride meaning "long " is one of the 31 Kangxi radicals (214 radicals in total) composed of three strokes.

In the Kangxi Dictionary, there are nine characters (out of 49,030) to be found under this radical.

 is also the 26th indexing component in the Table of Indexing Chinese Character Components predominantly adopted by Simplified Chinese dictionaries published in mainland China. Note that while this radical composed of three strokes in Traditional Chinese, it is treated as a two-stroke component in Simplified Chinese, with the two turning strokes becoming one continuous stroke.

Evolution

Derived characters

Literature

External links

Unihan Database - U+5EF4

054
026